The Arkham Knight is an alias used by two supervillains appearing in DC Comics media. Both characters are depicted as enemies of the superhero Batman. The original version was created to serve as the titular villain of Rocksteady Studios' 2015 video game Batman: Arkham Knight, the fourth main installment in the Batman: Arkham series. He first appeared in the debut issue of the prequel comic book of the same name in March 2015.

The Arkham Knight is introduced as the mysterious leader of a vast militia of mercenaries who harbors a deep-rooted grudge against Batman. He allies with the Scarecrow and provides a military presence in the evacuated Gotham City. Towards the end of the game's main story, the Arkham Knight is revealed to be Jason Todd, the former and second Robin adapted from the mainstream Batman mythos. In the game's continuity, Todd was thought to have been killed years earlier by the Joker, but was actually tortured and driven insane in Arkham Asylum.

The Arkham Knight persona was later adapted into the mainstream DC Universe in Detective Comics #1000 in March 2019. This version is a wholly original character named Astrid Arkham. Raised within Arkham Asylum by its inmates, Astrid grew to sympathize with Gotham's criminals and becomes the Arkham Knight to seek revenge against Batman for her mother's death.

Concept and creation

Batman: Arkham Knight introduced the Arkham Knight, a new villain created specifically for the game by Rocksteady Studios, comic-book writer Geoff Johns and comic artist Jim Lee. Troy Baker provided the character's voice in the game, which was released in June 2015.

According to game director Sefton Hill, "[Rocksteady] wanted to introduce someone who could really challenge Batman to go head to head with him in lots of different ways." When asked if the Arkham Knight was an entirely new character or simply new to the Batman: Arkham series, marketing producer Dax Ginn responded: "Completely original. Batman has not encountered him before, so this is a completely original design and role that the Arkham Knight brings." Ginn described the opportunity to create an original character in the Batman universe as "terrifying", but the developers at the studio relished the chance to make a mark on the Batman property that would last beyond the games themselves.

Lead character artist Albert Feliu has stated that the Arkham Knight's design reflects his role in the game as well as his knowledge of Batman's tactics and fighting style. The Arkham Knight wears a high-tech, militarized version of the Batsuit with short antennas that resemble bat ears to mock Batman. The "A" logo of the Arkham Asylum facility is worn as an emblem on his chest. His angular chest plate acts as a means of deflecting the batclaw; his utility belt, in contrast to Batman's, is low-slung; and his gauntlets, boots and armor are influenced by the lightweight design of a fighter aircraft: "highly resistant, unreflective and totally intimidating". The Arkham Knight's holographic helmet conceals his identity with a robotic voice synthesizer, giving the impression of a ghostly figure, and his visor provides him with a heads-up display to monitor his militia forces. His suit has a distinct camouflage pattern of "dark greys interspersed with dashes of red [that] enable him to remain concealed between the gloomy shadows and garish neons of Gotham's alleyways and rooftops".

To commemorate the eightieth anniversary of the Batman mythos in 2019, DC Comics debuted a new iteration of the Arkham Knight in Detective Comics #1000. Taking place within the mainstream DC Universe, separate from the continuity of the Batman: Arkham games, this version of the character was created by Peter J. Tomasi and Doug Mahnke.

Fictional character biography

Batman: Arkham

In Batman: Arkham Knight, the Arkham Knight forms an alliance with the Scarecrow to unite all of Gotham City's criminals in an attempt to finally destroy Batman. On Halloween night, Scarecrow forces the civilian evacuation of Gotham with his new strain of fear toxin, allowing the Arkham Knight's militia to take control of the city. The Arkham Knight first encounters Batman at Ace Chemicals, where Scarecrow prepares to cover the Eastern Seaboard with fear gas. While Batman works to inhibit the blast radius, the Arkham Knight kidnaps Barbara Gordon and holds her hostage. The Arkham Knight shoots and subdues Batman before helping Scarecrow extract and activate the "Cloudburst", a mass dispersal device for the fear toxin. Batman uses the Batmobile to destroy the Cloudburst and pursues the Arkham Knight to the militia's headquarters. When Batman attempts to rescue a captured Commissioner Gordon, the Arkham Knight reveals himself as Jason Todd, the former Robin who was tortured and seemingly murdered by the Joker but was actually left traumatized. The Arkham Knight is defeated and vanishes after refusing Batman's offer to help him recover.

Flashbacks throughout the game reveal that during his time as Robin, Jason was captured by the Joker, who faked Jason's death and held him in an abandoned wing of Arkham Asylum for over a year to break his sanity. Jason grew to despise Batman upon learning that he had been replaced and abandoned. The prequel comic book Batman: Arkham Knight and the 6-issue miniseries Batman: Arkham Knight Genesis explore how Jason, after escaping from the asylum, planned his revenge against Batman as depicted in the game. With the help of the assassin Deathstroke, Jason spent years assembling and training his militia in Venezuela as the Arkham Knight.

Mainstream DC Universe

In the mainstream DC Universe, the Arkham Knight is the founder of the Knights of the Sun, a cult of Arkham Asylum inmates devoted to ridding Gotham City of Batman. The Arkham Knight is eventually revealed to be Astrid Arkham, the daughter of doctors Jeremiah Arkham, the nephew of the asylum's founder Amadeus Arkham; and Ingrid Karlsson, a kind-hearted woman well liked by even the most dangerous patients.

Astrid was born during a riot at the asylum, in the course of which Ingrid was killed by a batarang thrown by an inmate. After being delivered safely with the help of the Joker, Harley Quinn, Poison Ivy, Clayface, and Solomon Grundy, Astrid was raised and homeschooled by Jeremiah in the asylum. She befriended the incarcerated supervillains and would sit outside the Joker's cell to read fairy tales with him, growing to idolize the knights in these stories. Astrid developed a grudge against Batman and saw him as a demon that tormented her friends. This grudge turned into hatred when she uncovered video tapes of Ingrid being struck by a batarang. Believing that Batman had murdered her mother, Astrid trained to become a skilled fighter and, inspired by the knights in her bedtime stories, rechristened herself as the Arkham Knight to seek revenge against Batman.

Other appearances
Following the release of Batman: Arkham Knight, the Arkham Knight (Jason Todd) was added as a playable character in the mobile version of the video game Injustice: Gods Among Us.

Reception
The reveal of the Arkham Knight's identity in Batman: Arkham Knight was met with a mixed reception from critics, who took issue with Rocksteady's marketing of the Arkham Knight as an original character, as the moniker was original but the character in the role was not.

Dan Stapleton of IGN felt the problem was that the marketing for the character indicated it was a "big mystery" to his identity, but any "moderately knowledgeable Batman fan could reasonably" deduce the identity: "We all already knew who the Arkham Knight was; we were just hoping it wasn't true because we wanted the original story we'd been promised." Stapleton added, "when the Arkham Knight was unmasked, I felt deceived – not in the good “Ah, you got me!” way, like when you’re fooled by the characters or an unreliable narrator a la Verbal Kent [sic], but in the bad way, where I’d been duped to by the storytellers themselves." Paul Tassi of Forbes criticized Rocksteady for promising a new character and insisting the identity "would shock and amaze us all" when it turned out to essentially be "a renamed and recostumed version of a character that has already existed for years." Pete Haas of Cinemablend wrote: "The issue is that Todd fits too well. The developers could have done more to make the Arkham Knight's identity a secret. They could have tried to throw us off by teasing other characters that could be Arkham Knight. Or they could have just downplayed the similarities between Arkham Knight's costume and Red Hood's, or Batman and Arkham Knight's. Or he could've used a voice modulator that made him sound less like a twenty-something American. If you think Jason Todd is the Arkham Knight before you start playing the game, the game does nothing to challenge that assumption. That's an issue."

Other outlets, including Game Informer, praised Todd's reveal, calling it "satisfying" and "the mother of all twists". VideoGamer.com also gave a positive response to the "who is it?" nature surrounding the Knight throughout the game.

GamesRadar also took note that the torture scenes and Red Hood DLC made it easier to predict the twist. "Honestly, in the torture scenes, I'm certain that everyone who predicted Jason Todd before the game came out went, "Yeah, it's definitely him," in that moment. The pre-order DLC featuring Todd's Red Hood persona was arguably a clue, too (or, looking at it from another side, a brave bluff)."

Notes

References

Sources
 

Batman: Arkham
Characters created by Doug Mahnke
Characters created by Geoff Johns
Characters created by Jim Lee
Characters created by Peter Tomasi
Comics characters introduced in 2015
DC Comics female supervillains
DC Comics male supervillains
DC Comics martial artists
DC Comics orphans
DC Comics supervillains
Fictional characters with post-traumatic stress disorder
Fictional commanders
Fictional gunfighters in video games
Fictional kidnappers
Fictional marksmen and snipers
Fictional martial artists in video games
Fictional mass murderers
Fictional mercenaries in comics
Fictional mercenaries in video games
Fictional military strategists
Fictional mixed martial artists
Fictional stalkers
Fictional swordfighters in comics
Fictional terrorists
Fictional war criminals
Fictional warlords in video games
Fictional women soldiers and warriors
Male characters in video games
Male video game villains
Orphan characters in video games
Video game bosses
Video game characters introduced in 2015
Video game supervillains